Kantale railway station is a railway station in the town of Kantale in eastern Sri Lanka. Owned by Sri Lanka Railways, the state-owned railway operator, the station is part of the Trincomalee line which links Trincomalee District with the capital Colombo.

Services

See also
 List of railway stations in Sri Lanka
 List of railway stations in Sri Lanka by line

Railway stations in Trincomalee District
Railway stations on the Trincomalee Line